Model Latina was an American reality competition show in which aspiring models compete against one another in fashion and cultural challenges. They are judged by a panel of fashion experts and celebrities from the American Latino entertainment industry. Model Latina is the first modeling competition of its kind to feature Latinas from all over the United States. The show airs on the cable network NuvoTV.

As of July 2012, five people have won the competition. Winners typically receive a one-year contract with leading modeling agency Q Management, a cash prize and an opportunity to be a NuvoTV host.

Format
Each season of Model Latina has 10–13 episodes and begins with 10–20 contestants. Contestants are judged weekly on their overall appearance, participation in challenges, runway work and best shot from that week's photo shoot. In each episode, one contestant is eliminated from the competition, and in rare cases, a double elimination occurs.

Hosts and judges
The series employs a panel of judges who critique contestants' progress throughout the competition. Throughout its broadcast, the program has employed three different hosts and eleven different judges. Ellie Rodriguez was the show's host for seasons 1–3, and was replaced by Jazmín López	 for season 4 and by Jocelyn Pierce for season 5. The original judging panel consisted of Franco Lacosta, Jeffrey Kolsrud and Katrina Campins. For season 2, the original panel returned as guest judges with Jorge Ramon, Jai Rodriguez and Jennifer Gimenez as the main judges. Lacosta and Annette Rosario replaced Rodriguez and Gimenez for season 3 and Kolsrud served as the only guest judge. Tomiko Fraser Hines and Alex Cambert replaced Rosario and Ramon for season 4. For season 5, Carlos Ponce and Inés Rivero replaced Hines and Cambert.

Series overview
NuvoTV has aired 5 installments of the Model Latina franchise, beginning with Model Latina, season 1 (or Model Latina: LA) in 2008. Each season has been filmed in a different location within the United States.

Model Latina: LA 
Model Latina, season 1 (or Model Latina: LA) was the first season of Model Latina. It originally aired on NuvoTV from 27 July to 12 October 2008, and was hosted by Ellie Rodriguez. The judging panel consisted of photographer Franco Lacosta, Q Management's CEO Jeffrey Kolsrud and reality star Katrina Campins. The season was filmed in Los Angeles, California. The cycle's catchphrase was “Beauty is only the beginning.”

The winner of the competition was 25-year-old Jessica Caban from The Bronx, New York, emerging as Sí TV's (now NuvoTV) first ever Model Latina, with Darlenis Duran placing as runner-up.

Contestants

Notes

Episodes

Results

 The contestant won photo of the week
 The contestant was in danger of elimination
 The contestant was eliminated
 The contestant won the competition

 Episodes 1, 2 and 3 were casting episodes. In episode 3, the pool of 20 semi-finalists was reduced to the 10 models who moved on to the main competition.
 In episode 8, Mishell and Victoria were called together as the bottom two and both were eliminated.
 Episode 11 was a recap episode.
 Episode 12 ended with a cliffhanger and continued in the following episode.

Challenges

Episode 3 photo shoot: Natural posing (casting)
Episode 4 photo shoots: Swimsuit; Make-under look
Episode 5 casting: Music video: Veze Skante, "Covergirl"
Episode 6 photo shoot: Personal style
Episode 7 photo shoot: Paige Premium Denim print ad
Episode 8 photo shoot: Candid photographs for restaurant advertisements
Episode 9 commercial: Public service announcement for Voto Latino organization
Episode 10 photo shoot: Magazine layouts for Latina magazine
Episode 12 fashion show: Fashion show for Susana Mercedes and Eduardo Lucero (self-directed)

Model Latina: Miami 
Model Latina, season 2 (or Model Latina: Miami) was the second season of Model Latina. It originally aired on NuvoTV from 2 August to 18 October 2009, and was hosted by Ellie Rodriguez. The judging panel consisted of Jai Rodriguez, Jennifer Gimenez and Jorge Ramon. The season was filmed in Miami, Florida. The cycle's catchphrase was “Passion. Style. Sophistication.”

The winner of the competition was 21-year-old Codie Cabral from Murrieta, California, with Christine Juarbe placing as runner-up.

Contestants

Notes

Episodes

Results

 The contestant won photo of the week
 The contestant was in danger of elimination
 The contestant was eliminated
 The contestant won the competition

 In episode 1, after their first photoshoot, the models were secretly judged by guest judge Jeffrey Kolsrud from Q Management. As a result, when they arrived to the model's house, Ellie announced that Yimarie, Lisa and Sonia have been eliminated.
 Episode 11 was a recap episode.
 Episods 12 ended with a cliffhanger and continued in the following episode.

Challenges

Episode 1 photo shoot: Promo shoot 
Episode 2 photo shoot: Nicolita swimsuits in the pool
Episode 3 photo shoot: Jungle runway
Episode 4 photo shoot: Mirror image of their mothers
Episode 5 photo shoot: Emotions with Alfonso de Anda
Episode 6 photo shoot: Epic Hotel's brochure
Episode 7 photo shoot: Verizon Wireless billboard ad in pairs
Episode 8 photo shoot: Liza & Tara's island girl
Episode 9 commercial: Orbit Mist hydrating gum
Episode 10 photo shoot: Compcard
Episode 12 fashion show: Fashion show for Anel Verna (self-directed)

Model Latina: NYC 
Model Latina, season 3 (or Model Latina: NYC) was the third season of Model Latina. It originally aired on NuvoTV from 2 August to 25 October 2010, and was hosted by Ellie Rodriguez. The judging panel consisted of Jorge Ramon, Franco Lacosta and new judge Annette Rosario. Online castings took place on March 15, 2010. The season was filmed in New York City, New York. The cycle's catchphrase was “Competition Beyond the Runway.”

The winner of the competition was 20-year-old Elora Pérez from Queens, New York, with Jessica Santiago and Nashlly Estefania Sokoli both placing as runners-up.

Contestants

Notes

Episodes

Results

 The contestant won photo of the week
 The contestant was in danger of elimination
 The contestant was eliminated
 The contestant was originally eliminated, but was saved
 The contestant quit the competition
 The contestant won the competition

 In episode 1, after their first and second photoshoot, the models were secretly judged by guest judge Jeffrey Kolsrud from Q Management. As a result, when they arrived to the model's house, Ellie announced that Carla, Yami and Patricia have been eliminated.
 In episode 3, Victoria quit the competition. As a result, Yami, who was eliminated in episode 1, was chosen to return to the competition.
 Episode 11 was a recap episode.

Challenges

Episode 1 photo shoot: Promo shoot 
Episode 2 photo shoot: Nicolita bikini on a bus
Episode 3 photo shoot: Concrete jungle in Harlem
Episode 4 commercial: Verizon in groups
Episode 5 photo shoot: Bloomingdale's fashion show
Episode 6 photo shoot: Orbit's street cleanup
Episode 7 commercial: Nationwide Insurance in close-up
Episode 8 photo shoot: High fashion at the Brooklyn Bridge
Episode 9 photo shoot: Dance genres with male dancer
Episode 10 photo shoot: Alter-ego for Ford Fiesta
Episode 12 photo shoot: Fuerza Bruta
Episode 13 photo shoot and fashion show: Mother and daughter; Fashion show for Hernan Lander

Model Latina: Las Vegas 
Model Latina, season 4 (or Model Latina: Las Vegas) was the fourth season of Model Latina. It originally aired on NuvoTV from 15 August to 24 October 2011, and was hosted by Jazmín López (replacing Ellie Rodriguez). The judging panel consisted of Franco Lacosta and 2 new judges Alex Cambert and Tomiko Fraser Hines. The season was filmed in Las Vegas, Nevada. The cycle's catchphrase was “Bigger. Brighter. Bolder.”

The winner of the competition was 25-year-old Erika Marie Cavazos from Weslaco, Texas, with Stephanie Pagan placing as runner-up.

Contestants

Notes

Episodes

Results

 
 The contestant won photo of the week
 The contestant was in danger of elimination
 The contestant was eliminated
 The contestant was originally eliminated, but was saved
 The contestant won the competition

Challenges

Episode 1 photo shoot: Burlesque at the pool
Episode 2 photo shoot: Nude beauty shots with shadows
Episode 3 photo shoot: 1940's inspired Pin-ups
Episode 4 photo shoot: Snakes & Tigers
Episode 5 photo shoot: Ring Girls
Episode 6 photo shoot: Same-sex newlyweds
Episode 7 photo shoot: Zumanity showgirls
Episode 8 photo shoot: Posing on a dress out of Orbitz gum wrappers
Episode 9 photo shoot: 7 Deadly Sins on the desert
Episode 10 photo shoot: Editorial at the Grand Canyon
Episode 11 photo shoot: Glamour at The Strat
Episode 12 photo shoot: 1970's retro shoot for Latina Magazine
Episode 13 photo shoot: Showgirls

Model Latina: South Beach 
Model Latina, season 5 (or Model Latina: South Beach) was the fifth season of Model Latina. It originally aired on NuvoTV from 28 May to 23 July 2012, and was hosted by Jocelyn Pierce (replacing Jazmín López). The judging panel consisted of Franco Lacosta and new judges Carlos Ponce and Inés Rivero. The season was filmed in Miami Beach, Florida. This was the first season of Model Latina to include only 10 contestants and air fewer than 13 episodes. The season's 10 episodes were broadcast over a nine-week span. Each episode was shortened from the previous 60 minutes to 30.

The winner of the competition was 21-year-old Muriel Villera from Hialeah, Florida, with Marlene Cruz and Oneisys Amador placing as runners-up.

Contestants

Notes

Episodes

Results

 The contestant won photo of the week
 The contestant was in danger of elimination
 The contestant was disqualified from the competition
 The contestant was eliminated
 The contestant was originally eliminated, but was saved
 The contestant won the competition

 In episode 9, at the judging room, it was discovered that Rachell had not followed the requirement to terminate all prior modelling contracts before competing on the show.

Challenges

Episode 1 photo shoot: Self-styled runway
Episode 2 photo shoot: Underwater swimsuit with dolphins
Episode 3 photo shoot: Action-packed shoot in pairs
Episode 4 photo shoot: Lingerie
Episode 5 photo shoot: Luxury in the yacht with Carlos Ponce
Episode 6 photo shoot: High-fashion sophisticated woman in Vizcaya villa
Episode 7 commercial: Nissan Zero Emission car in one-take
Episode 8 photo shoot: Goddesses of Speed
Episode 9 photo shoot: Jewelry at the beach
Episode 10 fashion show: Fashion show for Juan Colón

Sponsors
For season 1, Hewlett-Packard and Southwest Airlines were the commercial sponsors. Verizon Wireless, Fuze and Wrigley were series sponsors for season 2. The series sponsors for season 3 were Verzion Wireless, Bloomingdale's and Orbitz. For season 4, Verzion Wireless and Orbit provided sponsorship. Verzion Wireless and Revlon were series sponsors for season 5.

References

External links
Official Website (via Internet Archive)

2008 American television series debuts
2012 American television series endings
2000s American reality television series
2010s American reality television series
English-language television shows
Modeling-themed reality television series